Parliamentary elections were held in Brazil on 3 October 1954. The Social Democratic Party remained the largest party in both the Chamber of Deputies and the Senate. Voter turnout was 65.5%.

Results

Chamber of Deputies

Senate

References

General elections in Brazil 
Brazil
Legislative
Brazil
Election and referendum articles with incomplete results